Retiniphyllum concolor is a species of flowering plant in the family Rubiaceae.

It occurs from Colombia to Guyana and northern Brazil.

References

External links 
 World Checklist of Rubiaceae

Retiniphylleae
Flora of the Amazon
Flora of Brazil
Flora of Colombia
Flora of Guyana